Caenoplanini is a tribe of land planarians in the subfamily Rhynchodeminae mostly found throughout the Australasian and Oceanian realms.

Description
The tribe Caenoplanini is defined as containing land planarians with multiple eyes along the body, which do not spread dorsally, ventrally located testes and a thick layer of longitudinal muscles.

Phylogeny and systematics
Based on morphological evidence, species now classified as Caenoplanini were initially considered a subfamily, Caenoplaninae, and sister group of the subfamily Geoplaninae. Both were united by the presence of multiple eyes along the body and distinguished from each other by the presence of dorsal testes in Geoplaninae and ventral ones in Caenoplaninae.

However, molecular studies revealed that this classification was artificial and that Caenoplaninae were actually closely related to Rhynchodeminae. Therefore, recent classification puts the former subfamilies Rhynchodeminae and Caenoplaninae as tribes, respectively Rhynchodemini and Caenoplanini, within an expanded subfamily Rhynchodeminae. This group is supported by molecular phylogeny, but there are no known synapomorphies.

Genera
Currently the tribe Caenoplanini comprises the following genera:
Arthurdendyus Jones, 1999
Artioposthia von Graff, 1896
Australopacifica Ogren & Kawakatsu, 1991
Australoplana Winsor, 1991
Caenoplana Moseley, 1877
Coleocephalus Fyfe, 1953
Endeavouria Ogren & Kawakatsu, 1991
Fletchamia Winsor, 1991
Kontikia C. G. Froehlich, 1955
Lenkunya Winsor, 1991
Newzealandia Ogren & Kawakatsu, 1991
Pimea Winsor, 1991
Reomkago Winsor, 1991
Tasmanoplana Winsor, 1991

References

Geoplanidae